Yuyu, Yu Yu, or variant may refer to:

People
 Yuyu (High Priest of Osiris), Egyptian New Kingdom priest
 Xia Gui (1195-1224), also known as "Yüyü", Chinese landscape painter
 Yuyu Sutisna (born 1962), 22nd Chief of Staff of the Air Force Indonesian Army
 Ma Yu-yu (马友友, 馬友友), ethnic Chinese cellist
Ran Yu-Yu (輝優優), Japanese pro wrestler
Yuya or Yuyu, Egyptian New Kingdom courtier

Other uses
 Yû Yû, Japanese animanga
 Yuyu language, extinct Australian Aboriginal language

See also 
Yueyu, the Cantonese Chinese
Yueyue (disambiguation)
Yuyue (disambiguation)